The shrub Ribes lacustre is known by the common names prickly currant, black swamp gooseberry, and black gooseberry. It is widely distributed in North America.

Description
The shrub grows erect to spreading, . Clusters of reddish to maroon flowers bloom from April through August.
Racemes of 5 to 15 pink disk-shaped flowers hang from stems covered with short hairs, bristles and spines.

Distribution and habitat
It is widely distributed, from California to Alaska and across North America east to Pennsylvania and Newfoundland, and south as far as New Mexico. It may be found in low-elevation forests to the subalpine.
Outside its native range, Ribes species may be invasive.

See also
 Blackcurrant
 Jostaberry

References

External links

Jepson Manual Treatment

lacustre
Plants described in 1805
Flora of North America